The Captain and the Enemy is the last novel published by the English author Graham Greene.

Synopsis 
The Captain and the Enemy tells the story of a young boy named Victor Baxter taken away from his boarding school by a stranger to live in London. This stranger is simply known as "the Captain" and he appears mysterious to Victor. In London Victor companions a woman named Liza and tells her any news that happens in the outside world. When Victor reaches manhood, he finally learns the secrets and intelligence of the Captain.

References

Novels by Graham Greene
1988 British novels